Minchin is a surname. Notable people with the surname include:
 Alfred Minchin (1917–1998), British Free Corps collaborator
 Edward Alfred Minchin (1866–1915), British zoologist
 Frederick F. Minchin (1890–1927?), English aviator
 Humphrey Minchin (1727–1796), British politician 
 A. Keith Minchin (1899–1963), founder of Koala Farm, Adelaide
 Louise Minchin (born 1968), British television presenter
 Nick Minchin (born 1953), Australian politician, senator for South Australia
 R. E. Minchin (1831–1893), first director, Adelaide Zoo, South Australia
A. C. Minchin (1857–1934),  director, Adelaide Zoo 1893 to 1934
R. R. Minchin (grandson), director, Adelaide Zoo 1935 to 1940
 Tim Minchin (born 1975), Australian comedian, actor and musician

Fictional characters:
 Miss Minchin, headmistress in A Little Princess

Places 
 Minchin Abad, a city in Punjab, Pakistan
Minchinabad Tehsil, a tehsil in Punjab, Pakistan
 Minchinhampton, a town in Stroud District, England

See also 
 Edward Minchen (1852–1913), an Australian botanical artist
 Zhou Ming-Zhen (1918–1996), aka Minchen M. Chow, a Chinese paleomammalogist
 John Minshull (1741–1793), aka Minchin, an English cricketer
 Lake Minchin, a former lake on the Altiplano of South America
 Minna Herzlieb nicknamed Minchin (1789–1865), a German female publisher